The women's Grand World Cup of the 2014–15 ISU Speed Skating World Cup was the season overall competition, for which all individual races and distances over the entire season counted, with points awarded to the top five competitors of each race.

Heather Richardson of the United States successfully defended her title from the previous season.

Rules
All races and distances that were competed individually, including the mass start, counted.

Points system
In order to determine an overall World Cup winner, a special points system was used, awarding points for the top five skaters in each individual event.

Note: half points were awarded in distances that were skated twice in the same competition.

Prize money

The Grand World Cup winner was awarded $20000.

Standings 
Standings as of 22 March 2015 (end of the season).

References 

Women GWC